Vulkan is a cross-platform 3D graphics and computing API.

Vulkan may also refer to:

Military and shipbuilding
 Bremer Vulkan, a former shipbuilding company on the river Weser, Bremen-Vegesack, Germany
 P-1000 Vulkan, an anti-ship missile
 R-25 Vulkan, a Yugoslav surface-to-air missile project
 SMS Vulcano, 1843 Austro-Hungarian Navy paddle steamer renamed Vulkan
 SMS Vulkan, a German U-boat salvage tug
 Vulkan-Hercules, a variant of the Russian Energia launch vehicle

Other uses
 Vulkán, the Hungarian name for the city of Vulcan, Hunedoara, Romania
 FK Vulkan, a Macedonian football club

See also
 Vulcan (disambiguation)
 Volcan (disambiguation)
 Volcano, a rupture on the crust of a planetary-mass object